Thomas Allen Holmoe (born March 7, 1960) is an American college athletics administrator and former football player and coach.  He has been the athletic director at Brigham Young University (BYU) since 2005.  Holmoe played college football at BYU and then professionally in the National Football League (NFL) with the San Francisco 49ers from 1983 to 1989.  He served as the head football coach at the University of California, Berkeley (Cal) from 1997 to 2001.

Playing career

College
Holmoe starred in both basketball and football at Crescenta Valley High School in La Crescenta, California. He accepted a football scholarship to BYU, where he played as a cornerback and safety from 1978 to 1982. As a sophomore in 1980, he led the Western Athletic Conference (WAC) with seven interceptions, and went on to earn all-WAC honors as a senior in 1982. The Cougars won the conference championship in each of his four seasons at BYU. At BYU, he was a teammate of Super Bowl winning quarterback Jim McMahon and Super Bowl winning coach Andy Reid.

Professional
Holmoe was drafted in the fourth round of the 1983 NFL Draft by the San Francisco 49ers. He played seven seasons for the 49ers, winning Super Bowls with the team in 1984, 1988 and 1989, before retiring due to a knee injury.

Coaching career
After retiring from playing, Holmoe entered the coaching ranks, having been urged by LaVell Edwards to return to BYU as a graduate assistant. In 1992, Holmoe accepted an offer from Bill Walsh to join his staff at Stanford University as the defensive backs coach. Holmoe remained at Stanford for two seasons, helping the 1992 Stanford Cardinal football team become the Pacific-10 Conference champions with a 10–3 overall record, including a win over Penn State in the Blockbuster Bowl.

Holmoe then returned to the 49ers, serving as George Seifert's defensive backfield coach for two seasons, where he coached such players as Deion Sanders, Merton Hanks and Eric Davis. As defensive backfield coach, he won a fourth Super Bowl in 1994. In 1996, Holmoe joined the staff at Cal as defensive coordinator under Steve Mariucci.

Following Mariucci's departure to the NFL in 1997, Holmoe was named his successor. Holmoe, by his own admission, was an unsuccessful coach.  During his five-year tenure at Cal, he compiled a 16–39 record overall with a 9–31 mark in Pac-10 play. His final season, 2001, saw the Golden Bears finish 1-10, still the worst season in school history.  Holmoe went 0–5 against rival Stanford and failed to reach a bowl game.  Holmoe resigned at the end of the 2001 season.

Shortly afterward, the Bears were found guilty of major NCAA violations when it emerged that a professor retroactively added two football players to a class he had taught the previous spring in order to keep them eligible. Athletic department officials knew that the players were ineligible, but did not disclose it to anyone. As a result, the NCAA slapped Cal with five years' probation, stripped the Bears of their four victories from the 1999 season, banned them from postseason play in 2002, and took away nine scholarships over four years. When Jeff Tedford led the Bears to a 7–5 record in 2002, they were not allowed to play in a bowl game.

Athletic administration
After resigning from Cal, Holmoe returned to BYU to serve as associate athletic director. In March 2005, he was appointed as BYU's 12th athletic director, and the first to oversee both men's and women's athletics (previously women's sports had its own athletic director). Under Holmoe's leadership, the Cougars have achieved success, winning 14 conference championships in the 2006–07 academic year alone and many others in subsequent years.  

Holmoe has had notable successes with his head coaching hires, including for football and men's basketball. He hired head football coach Bronco Mendenhall, who returned BYU's football team to national prominence, and head men's basketball coach Dave Rose, who led BYU's men's basketball team to consistent conference championships and NCAA tournament appearances. Following Bronco Mendenhall's departure to the University of Virginia and Dave Rose's retirement, Holmoe hired Kalani Sitake as head football coach and Mark Pope as men's head basketball coach, both of whom have led their teams to Top 25 national rankings in the end-of-season AP polls. 

During the COVID-19 pandemic, BYU's independent football schedule was drastically altered at the last minute as several conferences decided to play league-only games. Holmoe had to quickly piece together a full season of games. He was able to fill BYU's schedule and the team finished the year 11-1 and ranked #11 in the end-of-season AP Poll. His efforts were recognized by The National Association of Collegiate Directors of Athletics (NACDA) who awarded him with the 2020-2021 Athletics Director of the Year award.

On September 10, 2021, BYU accepted an invitation to join the Big 12 Conference for all sports. Holmoe was instrumental in positioning the Cougars for the invitation, having petitioned the Big 12 for membership in 2016 and again in 2021.

Personal life
Holmoe is a member of the Church of Jesus Christ of Latter-day Saints, converting from Lutheranism six years after leaving BYU. He lives in Provo, Utah, with his wife Lori and their four children. Holmoe's brother Steve, a physical education teacher and assistant football coach at Glendale High School, was a strong safety at UCLA before sustaining a career-ending injury.

Head coaching record

*Cal finished 4–7 (3–5 in conference), but later vacated the wins due to use of ineligible players

References

External links
 BYU profile
 
 

1960 births
Living people
American football safeties
BYU Cougars athletic directors
BYU Cougars football coaches
BYU Cougars football players
California Golden Bears football coaches
San Francisco 49ers coaches
San Francisco 49ers players
Stanford Cardinal football coaches
Players of American football from Los Angeles
Latter Day Saints from California
Latter Day Saints from Utah
Coaches of American football from California
Sports coaches from Los Angeles